Compsoptesis is a genus of flies in the family Tachinidae.

Species
 Compsoptesis phoenix Villeneuve, 1915
 Compsoptesis rufula Villeneuve, 1915

References

Tachinidae
Invertebrates of China